= Neville Brown (geophysicist) =

British geophysicist and historian (1932–2018)

Neville Brown (8 April 1932 – 28 May 2018). He was a Doctor of Science in Applied Geophysics. Since 1994 he was a senior member of Mansfield College in Oxford. His career was heavily involved in the interaction between the humanities and physics, particularly on sky sciences. He studied economics with geography at University College London (UCL) and later modern history at New College, Oxford.

While carrying out his studies he worked as a forecasting officer in the meteorological branch of the Fleet Air Arm (1957–1960) where he specialised in upper air analysis. With particular assignments including working at two British coastal stations, gunnery trials and junior staff duties with the Mediterranean Fleet. During his studies he took on the role of field meteorologist on two School expeditions to sub-polar regions.

== Positions ==
Professor Brown held several roles over the years.

- 1980 – Elected a chair in International Security Affairs at the University of Birmingham.
- 1981 to 1986 – He became the first Chairman of the Council for Arms Control – This is a British body drawn from parliament, during this time he was deeply involved in the multinational debate about Ballistic Missile Defence.
- 1990 – Elected a Fellow of the Royal Astronomical Society.
- 1994 to 1997 – He was attached to the Directorate of Sensors and Electronic Systems (Within the Procurement Executive, UK Ministry of Defence (MOD), His role here was the Academic Consultant to the Official Pre-Feasibility study on what policy, if any, Britain should have on Ballistic Missile Defence. In 1998 a declassified version of the Fundamental Issues study he wrote was published by Mansfield College.
- 1995 – Conferred as Doctorate of Science in Applied Geophysics by the University of Birmingham
- 2000 – Editor for a very seminal Sino-European Conference in Beijing on Ballistic Missile Defence.

== Publications ==
- Strategic Mobility, Chatto and Windus for Institute for Strategic Studies, 1963, pp 256
- Britain in NATO, The Fabian Society, 1964, pp 50
- A History of the World in the Twentieth Century, with D. C. Watt and Frank Spencer.
- Professor Brown did Part 3 (1945–63), William Morrow, 1968, pp 615–808
- British Arms and Strategy, 1970–80, Royal United Services Institute (RUSI), 1969, pp. 73
- Arms Without Empire, Penguin, 1969, pp. 159
- European Security, 1972–80, Royal United Services Institute (RUSI), 1972, pp. 180
- The Future Global Challenge, RUSI and Crane Russak, 1977, pp 402
- New Strategy Through Space, Leicester University Press, 1980, pp. 295
- Silver Wings in the Twilight, Inaugural Lecture at the University of Birmingham, 1983, pp 26
- Limited World War?, Canberra Papers on Strategy and Defence No. 32, Australian National University, 1984, pp 105
- Nuclear First Use, with Sir Anthony Farrar−Hockley, RUSI, 1985, pp 108
- The Future of Air Power, Croom Helm, 1986, pp 309
- South Africa: Sanctions or Targeted Aid?, with Yu−Ying Brown, Muirhead Foreign Policy Papers No. 1, University of Birmingham, 1987, pp 51
- The Strategic Revolution, Brassey's, 1992, pp 247
- Has SDI a Future?, Muirhead Paper 7, University of Birmingham, 1992, pp 20
- Water, Environment and Society in Times of Climate Change, Joint Editor with Arie S. Issar, Kluwer, 1998, pp 355
- The Fundamental Issues Study. Within the British Missile Defence (BMD) review. Prepared by the author in his capacity as the Academic Consultant in the official task force that worked from 1992 to 1997 on a report critically assessing the BMD options Britain had. A declassified version of the Fundamental Issues Study was published by Mansfield College, Oxford in 1998, pp 137
- Editor for American Missile Defence, Views from China and Europe, Oxford Research Group, 2000, pp 77. This was the report on a conference held in Beijing that May, a conference attended by c.30 ranking ministers, officials and academics from China, Britain, France and Germany.
- History and Climate Change, a Eurocentric Perspective, Routledge, 2001, pp 391
- Global Instability and Strategic Crisis, Routledge, 2004, pp 318
- Engaging the Cosmos, Sussex Academic Press, 2006, pp 391
- The Geography of Human Conflict, Sussex Academic Press, 2009, pp 384
- The Bounds of Liberalism, Sussex Academic Press, 2014, pp 342
